In aviation terminology, the outside air temperature (OAT) or static air temperature (SAT) refers to the temperature of the air around an aircraft, but unaffected by the passage of the aircraft through it.

Aviation usage
The outside air temperature is used in many calculations pertaining to flight planning, some of them being takeoff performance, density altitude, cruise performance and go-around performance. In most texts, the abbreviation, "OAT" is used.

Units
Most performance and flight planning graphs and tables use either degrees Celsius or Fahrenheit or both. The Kelvin scale, however, is used for Mach number calculations. For example, the speed of sound in dry air is

where:
 is the speed of sound in knots,
 is the outside air temperature in kelvins.

Sources
Outside air temperature can be obtained from the aviation meteorological services, on the ATIS or measured by a probe on the aircraft. When measured by the airplane's probe in flight, it may have to be corrected for adiabatic (ram effect) rise and friction, particularly in high performance aircraft. Therefore, the outside air temperature is usually calculated from the total air temperature.

See also
Acronyms and abbreviations in avionics
Hot and high

References

Aviation meteorology
Atmospheric temperature